Protacraga micans is a moth in the family Epipyropidae. It was described by Walter Hopp in 1924. It is found in Brazil.

References

Moths described in 1924
Epipyropidae